Yorelvis Charles Martínez (born September 25, 1978 in Morón, Cuba) is a third baseman for Ciego de Ávila of the Cuban National Series and has also been a member of the Cuba national baseball team.

During the 90-game 2005-06 Cuban National Series, Charles batted .344 with 17 home runs and 72 runs batted in.

References
Olympics database

External links
 

1978 births
Living people
Olympic baseball players of Cuba
Baseball players at the 2004 Summer Olympics
Olympic gold medalists for Cuba
Olympic medalists in baseball
Medalists at the 2004 Summer Olympics
People from Morón, Cuba